Gabriel Eugen Matei (born 26 February 1990) is a Romanian footballer who plays as a defender and for CSO Filiași.

Club career

Steaua București 
Gabiel Matei was transferred to Steaua București for a reported transfer fee of €600,000. Pandurii Târgu Jiu will be receiving also €500,000 from a future transfer fee.

His career was marked by multiple injuries, thus he missed almost two seasons while at Steaua, having four surgeries in this period.

Zira
On 25 June 2017, Matei signed a one-year contract, with the option of a second year, with Azerbaijan Premier League club Zira FK.

Termalica Nieciecza
On 29 December 2017, Matei signed with Polish Ekstraklasa club Termalica Nieciecza.

Honours
Steaua București:
Romanian Liga I: 2012–13, 2013–14
Romanian Cup: 2014–15
Romanian Supercup: 2013
Romanian League Cup: 2014–15

Club

References

External links
  
 
 
 

1990 births
Living people
People from Curtea de Argeș
Romanian footballers
Romania under-21 international footballers
Association football defenders
Liga I players
Liga II players
Liga III players
Ekstraklasa players
Azerbaijan Premier League players
FC Internațional Curtea de Argeș players
CS Pandurii Târgu Jiu players
FC Steaua București players
FC Brașov (1936) players
ASA 2013 Târgu Mureș players
LPS HD Clinceni players
FC Argeș Pitești players
Górnik Łęczna players
Bruk-Bet Termalica Nieciecza players
CS Concordia Chiajna players
FC Astra Giurgiu players
Romanian expatriate footballers
Expatriate footballers in Azerbaijan
Romanian expatriate sportspeople in Azerbaijan
Expatriate footballers in Poland
Romanian expatriate sportspeople in Poland